The 2021 season was Kawasaki Frontale's 17th consecutive season in the J1 League, where they lifted the title for the fourth time in five years. They also competed in the AFC Champions League, Emperor's Cup, J.League Cup, and the Japanese Super Cup.

Squad
As of 1 July 2021.

First-team squad

Out on loan

Transfers

Transfers in

Transfers out

Competitions

J1 League

Table

Results summary

Results by matchday

Matches

Emperor's Cup

Results

J.League Cup

Matches

Prime stage

Japanese Super Cup

AFC Champions League

Group stage

Matches

Honors

Individual 

 J.League MVP: Leandro Damião
 J.League Best XI: Miki Yamane, Shogo Taniguchi, Jesiel, Yasuto Wakizaka, Akihiro Ienaga, Reo Hatate, Leandro Damião
 J1 League Fair Play Award: Miki Yamane

Statistics

Goal scorers

Clean sheets

References

Kawasaki Frontale
Kawasaki Frontale seasons